The Latin American and Caribbean Unity Summit (Spanish: Cumbre de la Unidad de América Latina y el Caribe) was an international summit held on 22 and 23 February 2010 in Playa del Carmen, Mexico. The summit was the joint celebration of the XXI Rio Summit and the II Latin American and Caribbean Summit on Integration and Development  (CALC).

32 countries participated. While the summit was intended to cover 33 countries, Honduras was excluded because of the coup d'état against Manuel Zelaya.

Participating states adopted the Cancún Declaration, calling for the creation of the Community of Latin American and Caribbean States, replacing the Rio Group and the Summit of Latin America and the Caribbean on Integration and Development (CALC).

References

Bibliography

External links 
 Official declaration
 Official declaration (Spanish)

2010 conferences
2010 in international relations
2010 in South America
2010 in the Caribbean
Diplomatic conferences in Mexico
Community of Latin American and Caribbean States